Królikarnia (in English, "The Rabbit House") is a historic classicist palace in Warsaw, Poland; and a neighborhood in the Mokotów district of Warsaw.

Since 1965 the palace has housed a museum dedicated to Polish sculptor Xawery Dunikowski.

History

The palace is named for its former function as a rabbit warren for Poland's King Augustus II the Strong (reigned 1697–1706 and 1709–33).

The Królikarnia was erected on the picturesque Wisła River escarpment between 1782 and 1786 for King Stanisław August Poniatowski's Theatre Entrepreneur and Chamberlain, Charles Thomatis, Count de Valéry, by royal architect Domenico Merlini.
It was modeled after the famous Renaissance-era Villa Rotonda outside Vicenza, Italy, designed by Andrea Palladio.

On his estate, the Count established a brewery, brickyard, inn, mill, barn, and garden with vineyard.  Thomatis has also been described as a pimp for King Stanisław August Poniatowski (reigned 1764–95); and the Count's "villa at Królikarnia [as] little more than a high-class brothel".

In 1794, during the Kościuszko Uprising, the insurrection's leader Tadeusz Kosciuszko resided in the palace.

In 1816 the estate was purchased by Michał Hieronim Radziwiłł, and in 1849 by Ksawery Pusłowski, a passionate art collector.  In 1879 the palace was partly destroyed by fire, and shortly afterward was rebuilt for the Pusłowski family by Józef Huss.
 
During World War II, in 1939 and 1945, the Królikarnia was completely destroyed by German bombardments.

In 1964 it was rebuilt to house a collection of sculptures by Xawery Dunikowski, and now houses the Xawery Dunikowski Museum of Sculpture, opened in 1965.  The Museum is a branch of the National Museum in Warsaw.  It also organizes temporary exhibits of art by Polish and foreign contemporary artists.  In the Królikarnia Park, named after the palace, a sculpture park showcases exhibits from the National Museum's rich collections.

See also
Architecture of Poland

References

External links

 Królikarnia Museum

Mokotów
Palaces in Warsaw
Museums in Warsaw
Neoclassical architecture in Warsaw
Art museums and galleries in Poland
National museums of Poland
Museums established in 1965
1965 establishments in Poland
1786 establishments in Poland
Houses completed in 1786
Rotundas in Europe
Neighbourhoods of Mokotów